Hartley's Crocodile Adventures is a  wildlife sanctuary and ecotourism park located between Cairns and Port Douglas at Wangetti in Far North Queensland, Australia. It adjoins the world heritage listed Wet Tropics of Queensland rainforest through which visitors can take guided or self-guided walks.

Crocodile Farm
The park incorporates a commercial crocodile farm that breeds and raises saltwater crocodiles for their skins and meat.

Animals
Some of the species which live at the park include:

Reptiles

 Saltwater crocodile
 Freshwater crocodile
 American alligator
 Komodo dragon
 Lace monitor
 Pilbara rock monitor
 Gila monster
 Fiji crested iguana
 Rhinoceros iguana
 Philippine sailfin lizard
 Eastern water dragon
 Central bearded dragon
 Frill-neck lizard
 Veiled chameleon
 Madagascan giant day gecko
 Eastern blue-tongued lizard
 Northern red-throated skink
 Radiated tortoise
 Indian star tortoise
 Carolina box turtle
 Chinese three-striped box turtle
 Krefft's eastern short-neck turtle
 Reticulated python
 Burmese python
 Boa constrictor
 Amethystine python
 Carpet python
 Green tree python
 Western diamondback rattlesnake
 Monocled cobra
 Corn snake
 Desert death adder
 Tiger snake
 Coastal taipan
 Fierce snake
 Red-bellied black snake

Amphibians

 Australian green tree frog
 Dyeing poison dart frog

Mammals

 Koala
 Bare-nosed wombat
 Eastern grey kangaroo
 Antilopine wallaroo
 Swamp wallaby
 Red-legged pademelon

Birds

 Southern cassowary
 Emu
 Barn owl
 Tawny frogmouth
 Laughing kookaburra
 Jabiru
 Nankeen night heron
 Sulphur-crested cockatoo
 Eclectus parrot

See also

Cairns Tropical Zoo
Saltwater crocodile
Southern cassowary

References

External links

2002 establishments in Australia
Tourist attractions in Queensland
Zoos in Queensland
Cairns, Queensland
Port Douglas, Queensland